Altar of Sacrifice is a  Navajo Sandstone mountain in Zion National Park in Washington County, Utah, United States, that is part of the Towers of the Virgin.

Description
Its nearest higher neighbor is The West Temple,  to the south. Other neighbors include The Witch Head, Meridian Tower, Bee Hive, The Sentinel, Mount Spry, Bridge Mountain, and Mount Kinesava.

Etymology and Naming 
Altar of Sacrifice, The Great White Throne, and Angels Landing were named by Methodist Minister Frederick Vining Fisher from Ogden during a visit to Zion Canyon in 1916. This feature's name gained its appropriateness from dark red stains caused by hematite (iron oxide) that appear on the face of the east wall, as though great quantities of blood had been spilled from the top. Altar of Sacrifice's name was officially adopted in 1934 by the U.S. Board on Geographic Names.

Climate
Spring and fall are the most favorable seasons to visit Altar of Sacrifice. According to the Köppen climate classification system, it is located in a Cold semi-arid climate zone, which is defined by the coldest month having an average mean temperature below 32 °F (0 °C), and at least 50% of the total annual precipitation being received during the spring and summer.

Gallery

See also

 List of mountains in Utah
 Geology of the Zion and Kolob canyons area
 Colorado Plateau

References

External links

 Zion National Park National Park Service
 Altar of Sacrifice weather:  National Weather Service
 Web cam

Mountains of Utah
Zion National Park
Mountains of Washington County, Utah
Sandstone formations of the United States
Landforms of Washington County, Utah
North American 2000 m summits